The Most Gallant Order of Pahlawan Negara Brunei, also translated as The Most Gallant Order of the Hero of the State of Brunei, is an order of Brunei. It was established on 28 November 1959 by Sultan Omar Ali Saifuddien III.

The order consists of four classes:

Recipients

First Class 

 Unknown – Major General Husin – Commander of the Royal Brunei Armed Forces
 2011 – First Admiral Abdul Aziz – Commander of the Royal Brunei Navy
 2011 – First Admiral Abdul Halim – Commander of the Royal Brunei Navy
 2010 – Major General Tawih – Commander of the Royal Brunei Armed Forces
 2014 – Brigadier General Wardi – Commander of the Royal Brunei Air Force
 2015 – Major General Aminan – Commander of the Royal Brunei Armed Forces
 2015 – Major General Hamzah – Commander of the Royal Brunei Armed Forces
 2016 – Brigadier General Shahril Anwar – Commander of the Royal Brunei Air Force
 2018 – Irwan Hambali – Commissioner of Police
 2018 – Brigadier General Khairul – Commander of the Royal Brunei Land Forces
 2019 – Brigadier General Sharif – Commander of the Royal Brunei Air Force
 2021 – Major General Haszaimi – Commander of the Royal Brunei Armed Forces
 2022 – Brigadier General Abdul Razak – Deputy Minister of Defence
 2022 – Brigadier General Saifulrizal – Commander of the Royal Brunei Land Forces

Second Class 
 Unknown – Jaya Rajid – Commissioner of Police

References 

Orders, decorations, and medals of Brunei
Awards established in 1959
1959 establishments in Brunei